Nesothrips is a genus of thrips in the family Phlaeothripidae.

Species
 Nesothrips alexandrae
 Nesothrips aoristus
 Nesothrips artocarpi
 Nesothrips badius
 Nesothrips barrowi
 Nesothrips brevicollis
 Nesothrips brigalowi
 Nesothrips capricornis
 Nesothrips carveri
 Nesothrips coorongi
 Nesothrips doulli
 Nesothrips eastopi
 Nesothrips fodinae
 Nesothrips hemidiscus
 Nesothrips lativentris
 Nesothrips leveri
 Nesothrips major
 Nesothrips malaccae
 Nesothrips minor
 Nesothrips niger
 Nesothrips nigrisetis
 Nesothrips oahuensis
 Nesothrips peltatus
 Nesothrips pintadus
 Nesothrips propinquus
 Nesothrips rangi
 Nesothrips rossi
 Nesothrips semiflavus
 Nesothrips yanchepi
 Nesothrips yasumatsui
 Nesothrips zondagi

References

Phlaeothripidae
Thrips
Thrips genera